The Early Months, (also known as Teen Love: The Early Months), is a compilation album by American noise rock band No Trend, released in 1995 through Teenbeat Records. The disc compiles demo and live recordings that were made back when the band first formed, hence the title. The album was only released on CD format, limited to 1,100 copies. The album cover is exactly the same picture used for the band's 1983 debut extended play Teen Love, which was drawn by the band's guitarist Frank Price, who was credited as Jim Jones in the liner notes.

The first nine tracks were demo recordings that were recorded on March 18, 1983 at Inner Ear Studios. The last ten tracks were recorded during a live show the band played on January 9, 1983 at the Marble Bar.

Track listing

Personnel

Performers
Jeff Mentges - Vocals
Frank Price - Guitar, Artwork
Bob Strasser - Bass
Michael Salkind - Drums

Production
Don Zientara - Recording
Eric - Recording

References

1995 compilation albums
No Trend albums